Diphyllocis is a genus of tree-fungus beetle in the family Ciidae.

Species
 Diphyllocis opaculus Reitter, 1885

References

Ciidae genera